The Salvation Committee for Peace and Order is the collaborationist supreme administrative and executive authority in the territory of the Kherson Oblast, formed by the constituent Assembly on 10 March 2022 following the capture of most of the oblast's territory by the Russian Army in the 2022 Russian invasion of Ukraine.

Formation  
After the Russian army captured Kherson and occupied most of the region amidst the 2022 Russian invasion of Ukraine, former mayor of Kherson, Vladimir Saldo, the former deputy mayor for Social and Humanitarian Affairs Sergey Cherevko, as well as the director of the news agency Tavria News Kirill Stremousov, went to cooperate with Russia. As a result, on March 10, the "Salvation Committee for Peace and Order" was formed at the meeting, which declared its goal to maintain law and order in the territories of the region, as well as establishing trade, economic and socio-cultural ties with Russia.

The President of the committee Stremousov died in a car crash on 9 November 2022.

Activity 
According to Nezavisimaya Gazeta, the activities of the committee encountered constant resistance among the population, and a number of its members were killed by the Ukrainian secret service Chief Directorate of Intelligence (GUR) or Ukrainian partisans.

So far, one of the most significant actions of the committee is the introduction of the Russian ruble on the territory of the Kherson Oblast.

See also
 Russian occupation of Kharkiv Oblast
 Russian occupation of Zaporizhzhia Oblast

References

History of Kherson Oblast
Russian military occupations
Ukrainian collaborators with Russia during the 2022 Russian invasion of Ukraine